I Wish Someone Were Waiting for Me Somewhere is a French film directed by Arnaud Viard released in 2019 with an adapted screenplay from Anna Gavalda's homonymous collection of twelve short stories.

Plot 
Aurore celebrates her 70th birthday surrounded by her friends and four grown children: the eldest Jean-Pierre is the father of a family and wine representative, Juliette is a French teacher and dreams of career as a writer, Margaux is a freelance photographer, and Mathieu is single at 30 years old. Since the death of their father, Jean-Pierre naturally assumes the paternalistic and benevolent role with his siblings. One day, he is contacted by his old friend Héléna, a fashionable theater actress, who tells him terrible news.

Cast 
 Jean-Paul Rouve as Jean-Pierre
 Alice Taglioni as Juliet
 Benjamin Lavernhe as Mathieu
 Camille Rowe as Margaux
 Elsa Zylberstein as Héléna
 Aurore Clément as Aurora
 Sarah Adler as Nathalie
 Nicolas Vaude as publisher Oscar Valois
 Quentin Dolmaire as Andréa
 Eriq Ebouaney as Mathieu's doctor

Production 
Most of the filming took place in Fixin, in Côte-d'Or. Part of the shooting took place from September 3 to 7, 2018 in Dijon.

Box office 
The film was first released in France on January 22, 2020 in 367 theaters and sold 27,040 tickets on opening day. The first week ends with 212,027 tickets sold. The second weekend saw attendance drop by 57.07% despite 22 additional theaters. The film is entering its seventh week passed the bar of 450,000 tickets sold.

References

External links 
 

2019 films
French romantic drama films
2010s French-language films
Films shot in France
Films set in France
2010s French films